Skeels is an unincorporated community in Gladwin County in the U.S. state of Michigan. The community is located within Sherman Township along a curve in M-18. As an unincorporated community, Skeels has no legally defined boundaries or population statistics of its own.

History
A post office called Skeels was established in 1898, and remained in operation until 1920. Simeon Skeels, an early postmaster and local merchant, gave the community his last name.

References

Unincorporated communities in Michigan
Unincorporated communities in Gladwin County, Michigan